PP-8 Rawalpindi-II is a Constituency of Provincial Assembly of Punjab.

Area
Municipal Committee Gujjar Khan,
Qazian Circle Union Councils
Gujar Khan-I*
Gujar Khan-II and
Kauntrila Union Council of Gujar Khan Tehsil of Rawalpindi District.

2008—2013:PP-3 (Rawalpindi-III)

2013—2018:PP-3 (Rawalpindi-III)
General elections were held on 11 May 2013. Iftikhar Ahmad won this seat with 58916 votes.

All candidates receiving over 1,000 votes are listed here.

2018—2023: PP-8 (Rawalpindi-III)

General elections are scheduled to be held on 25 July 2018. In 2018 Pakistani general election, Javed Kausar a candidate of Pakistan Tehreek-e-Insaf won PP-8 Rawalpindi III election by taking 48,117 votes.

See also
 PP-7 Rawalpindi-I
 PP-9 Rawalpindi-III

References

External links
 Election commission Pakistan's official website
 Awazoday.com check result
 Official Website of Government of Punjab

R